Biriwa Chiefdom is a chiefdom in Bombali District of Sierra Leone. Its capital is Kamabai.

References 

Chiefdoms of Sierra Leone
Northern Province, Sierra Leone